John Taliaferro (1768 – August 12, 1852) was a nineteenth-century politician, lawyer and librarian from Virginia, serving several non-consecutive terms in the  U.S. House of Representatives in the early 19th Century.

Early life and education
Born on "Hays" near Fredericksburg, Virginia, Taliaferro attended the common schools as a child. He studied law and was admitted to the bar, commencing practice in Fredericksburg.

Career
Taliaferro was elected a Democratic-Republican to the United States House of Representatives in 1800, serving from 1801 to 1803. In 1811 he was elected again and served until 1813. His seat was at first declared for his opponent,  John Hungerford, but after a lengthy investigation and official rulings as to the legitimacy of the election, Taliaferro was eventually awarded the seat. The initial House committee ruled in Hungerford’s favor, but upon review the House itself decided that many ineligible voters had voted, which resulted in Hungerford’s removal from office, as the resulting vote tally from the election gave Taliferro a majority of 121 votes. 

In 1823, Taliaferro was elected to the House a third time, originally to fill a vacancy as a Crawford Republican, Adams Republican and Anti-Jacksonian.  He served from 1824 to 1831.

Taliferro's name is listed as the author of an anti-Jackson handbill distributed during the campaign of 1828. The handbill is called "Supplemental account of some of the bloody deeds of General Jackson" and describes itself as a supplement to the Coffin Handbills. In it, Jackson is accused of "atrocious and unnatural acts," including eating mercilessly-slaughtered Indians for breakfast.

Taliferro served in the Virginia Constitutional Convention of 1829-1830. He was elected as one of four delegates from a state Senate district of his home county in the Northern Neck, King George County, including Westmoreland, Lancaster, Northumberland, Richmond, Stafford and Prince William Counties.

Elected a fourth time in 1834, he ran as an Anti-Jacksonian and Whig, serving from 1835 to 1843.  He was chairman of the Committee on Revolutionary Pensions from 1839 to 1843.

Taliaferro worked as a librarian at the United States Department of the Treasury from 1850 to 1852.  He died at his farm "Hagley" near Fredericksburg on August 12, 1852.  He was interred on the property.

References

Bibliography

1768 births
1852 deaths
Virginia lawyers
Virginia Whigs
Politicians from Fredericksburg, Virginia
John
Virginia National Republicans
Democratic-Republican Party members of the United States House of Representatives from Virginia
National Republican Party members of the United States House of Representatives
Whig Party members of the United States House of Representatives
19th-century American politicians